Lepiota erminea, commonly known as the dune dapperling, is a species of agaric fungus in the family Agaricaceae. It is found in Europe and North America.

See also
 List of Lepiota species

References

External links

erminea
Fungi described in 1821
Fungi of Europe
Fungi of North America
Taxa named by Elias Magnus Fries